Stanley Wijesundera was a Sri Lankan academic. A professor of Chemistry, he was the first vice chancellor of the University of Colombo from 1979 to 1989 and was the chairman of the Association of Commonwealth Universities from 1983 to 1984.

He was born in Kandy, and educated at Trinity College, Dharmaraja College and Ananda College. Entering the University of Ceylon he studied at both the  Colombo campus and Peradeniya campus graduating with a BSc (Honours) in Chemistry. Going on to the University of London he gained his MSc and DSc and his PhD from the  University of Oxford.

On return to Ceylon he was appointed as a lecturer in the University of Ceylon, where he went on to become a professor of Chemistry, thereafter dean of the Faculty of Science and later was appointed as Vice Chancellor of the University of Colombo when it was established as an Independent university after the disestablishment of University of Sri Lanka.

During the 1987–89 JVP Insurrection, Wijesundera came under pressure from elements of the Janatha Vimukthi Peramuna (JVP) to shut down the university, which was steadfastly refused by him. This led to his assassination at the Library Room in the College House by members of the JVP on March 8, 1989.

He was married the daughter of Walter Wijewardena and was the brother-in-law of the Upali Wijewardene. He was the Basnayake Nilame of the Kelaniya Raja Maha Vihara, a post later taken up by his son Shalitha Wijesundara, former chairman of the Sri Lanka Airports Authority and current Provincial Councilor, Western Province. His youngest daughter Lakmini WIjesundera, founder and CEO of BoardPAC and IronOne Technologies is the Entrepreneur of the Year in Sri Lanka for three consecutive years since 2015 and has been the first Ernst & Young EY Winning Woman to represent Sri Lanka.

See also
 List of people assassinated by the Janatha Vimukthi Peramuna
 1987–89 JVP Insurrection
 Gladys Jayawardene

References

External links

 14th death anniversary of Prof. Stanley Wijesundera, The mantle of leadership fell always on his shoulders
 Tribute, Prof Stanley Wijesundera

Year of birth missing
1989 deaths
Sri Lankan academic administrators
Alumni of the University of Ceylon (Colombo)
Alumni of the University of London
Alumni of the University of Oxford
Academic staff of the University of Colombo
Assassinated Sri Lankan people
Assassinated educators
Academics from Kandy
Alumni of Trinity College, Kandy
Vice-Chancellors of the University of Colombo
Alumni of the University of Ceylon (Peradeniya)
Sinhalese academics
Wijewardena family